Comet Borrelly may mean:
 The numbered periodic comet 19P/Borrelly (a.k.a. 19P/1904 Y2, 1905 II, 1904e, 19P/1911 S1, 1911 VIII, 1911e, 1918 IV, 1918c 1925 VIII, 1925f, 1932 IV, 1932i, 1953 IV, 1954b, 1960 V, 1960k, 1967 VIII, 1967m, 1974 VII, 1973m, 1981 IV, 1980i, 1987 XXXIII, 1987p, 1994 XXX, 1994l)
 Or any of these long-period comets:
 C/1873 Q1 (a.k.a. 1873 IV, 1873c)
 C/1874 O1 (a.k.a. 1874 V, 1874d)
 C/1874 X1 (a.k.a. 1874 VI, 1874f)
 C/1877 C1 (a.k.a. 1877 I, 1877a)
 C/1889 X1 (a.k.a. 1890 I, 1889g)
 C/1903 M1 (a.k.a. 1903 IV, 1903c)
 C/1912 V1 (a.k.a. 1912 III, 1912c)
 It could also be a partial reference to these comets:
 C/1900 O1, Comet Borrelly-Brooks (a.k.a. 1900 II, 1900b)
 C/1909 L1, Comet Borrelly-Daniel (a.k.a. 1909 I, 1909a)

Borrelly